Vangelisti is a surname. Notable people with the surname include:

Paul Vangelisti (born 1945), American poet and broadcaster
Vincenzio Vangelisti ( 1740–1798), Italian engraver

See also
Evangelisti